Christopher Guy Whiting (born 13 July 1966) is an Australian politician. He has been the Australian Labor Party member for Bancroft in the Queensland Legislative Assembly since 2017, and previously represented Murrumba from 2015 to 2017.

Early life 
Whiting graduated from the University of Queensland with a Bachelor of Arts (Honours) and a Master of Journalism.

Political career
Prior to being elected as a member of the Queensland Parliament, he represented Burpengary, Beachmere and Deception Bay for 12 years on the Caboolture Shire Council and then the Moreton Bay Regional Council. During his time as a councillor, he was at the forefront of the revitalisation of the Deception Bay foreshore, the implementation of traffic calming strategies in Deception Bay, and the initiation of the Burpengary Greenlinks park land project. In 2012, he unsuccessfully ran for the position of mayor of Moreton Bay Regional Council.

Member of Parliament 
After his unsuccessful run for mayor, Whiting worked in real estate, before being preselected as the Labor candidate, at the 2015 state election, for the previously safe Labor seat of Murrumba, which Labor had lost in the 2012 state election. He was successful and became a member of the 55th Queensland Parliament. Following an electoral redistribution, Whiting chose to run for the notionally safe Labor seat of Bancroft at the 2017 election.

He is currently the chair of the State Development and Regional Industries Committee, and had previously served as Chief Government Whip.

References

1966 births
Living people
Members of the Queensland Legislative Assembly
Australian Labor Party members of the Parliament of Queensland
Queensland local councillors
Australian real estate agents
University of Queensland alumni
21st-century Australian politicians